Boki, Bokii, Bokiy, Boky, or Bokyi (Cyrillic: Бокій / Бокий) is a surname. Notable people include:

 Aleksandr Bokiy (born 1957), Belarusian footballer
 Gleb Bokii (1879–1937), Soviet politician and Cheka officer
 Gleb Bokiy (born 1970), Soviet figure skater
 Ihar Boki (born 1994), Belarusian Paralympic swimmer
 Ivan Bokyi (1942–2020), Ukrainian journalist and politician

See also
 
 
 
 
 

Belarusian-language surnames
Ukrainian-language surnames